Rico Fata (born February 12, 1980) is a Canadian former professional ice hockey player. He played for the Calgary Flames, New York Rangers, Pittsburgh Penguins, Atlanta Thrashers and Washington Capitals of the National Hockey League (NHL).

Playing career
As a youth, Fata played in the 1994 Quebec International Pee-Wee Hockey Tournament with a minor ice hockey team from Sault Ste. Marie, Ontario.

Fata's career started as a 15-year-old, when he played for his hometown Sault Ste. Marie Greyhounds of the Ontario Hockey League (OHL). In the 1996 OHL Entry Draft, Fata was selected first overall by the last place London Knights. In his three seasons in London, the team became a contender, reaching the OHL Finals in 1999, but losing in seven games to the Belleville Bulls.

Rico Fata was drafted in the first round, sixth overall by the Calgary Flames in the 1998 NHL Entry Draft. Despite his high draft position, he was not able to maintain a spot in the Flames lineup and mostly played in the American Hockey League (AHL). He won the  Calder Cup with the Saint John Flames in 2001. He was placed on waivers by Calgary and was claimed by the New York Rangers. He spent one and a half seasons with the Rangers before going to the Pittsburgh Penguins in an eight–player trade. On January 31, 2006, the Atlanta Thrashers claimed him off waivers from the Penguins. On March 9, 2006, the Washington Capitals claimed him off waivers from the Thrashers. He played 10 games at the start of the 2006–07 NHL season with Washington before being waived through the league.

On November 8, 2006 Fata signed a contract with the Adler Mannheim of the Deutsche Eishockey Liga (DEL).
On September 8, 2008 he signed a contract with the EHC Biel.
On August 1, 2011 he signed a one-year contract with the Genève-Servette HC of the Swiss National League A, with an option for one more year.

On June 17, 2013, after five seasons in the NLA, Fata left to sign a one-year contract with Finnish club, HIFK of the SM-liiga.

Career statistics

Regular season and playoffs

International

Awards and honours

Personal life
Fata's brother Drew also played professional hockey and played eight games for the New York Islanders. 

After retiring as a player, Fata opened the Fast By Fata Hockey School. Fata owns 2 Tim Hortons restaurants in Sault Ste. Marie.

References

External links

1980 births
Adler Mannheim players
Atlanta Thrashers players
Calgary Flames draft picks
Calgary Flames players
Canadian ice hockey forwards
Canadian people of Italian descent
Citizens of Italy through descent
EHC Biel players
Genève-Servette HC players
Hartford Wolf Pack players
Asiago Hockey 1935 players
HIFK (ice hockey) players
Ice hockey people from Ontario
Lausanne HC players
Living people
London Knights players
National Hockey League first-round draft picks
New York Rangers players
Pittsburgh Penguins players
Saint John Flames players
Sault Ste. Marie Greyhounds players
Sportspeople from Sault Ste. Marie, Ontario
Washington Capitals players
Wilkes-Barre/Scranton Penguins players
Canadian expatriate ice hockey players in Italy
Canadian expatriate ice hockey players in Finland
Canadian expatriate ice hockey players in Germany
Canadian expatriate ice hockey players in Switzerland